The Porsche 992 is the internal designation for the eighth and current generation of the Porsche 911 sports car, which was introduced at the Porsche Experience Center, Los Angeles on November 27, 2018.

Design  
The 992 uses rack and pinion steering and has a MacPherson strut front suspension and rear multi-link suspension. The 992 has wide rear-wheel arches which will be a part of every model in the 992 lineage (a change only found on high performance variants of the 911 previously) along with 20-inch wheels on the front and 21-inch wheels at the rear. 

Compared to its predecessor, the 992 is  wider and now uses aluminium body panels. The 992 also has a new rear bumper with larger exhaust tips than its predecessor. The front of the car is designed to mimic the appearance of an early 911 in a modern fashion. 992 models have electrical pop-out door handles, a retractable rear spoiler (for specific models only) and LED headlights. All models also feature a full-length rear light bar. The interior also has received significant changes including a straighter dashboard which harks back to the shape of the dash board used on the classic 911. The instrument cluster consists of two 7-inch digital displays and an analogue tachometer. Also a reference to the classic 911 models.

The engines have piezo injection, a revised intake system, and—in some markets under Euro-6 regulations—have engine particulate filters. At launch the only available transmission was an 8-speed PDK dual-clutch transmission, although now a 7-speed and 6-speed manual are available. The manual 7-speed will only be offered on the GTS and the 6-speed on the GT3 models initially, both of which will have the Sport Chrono Package as standard equipment with the manual transmission.

Equipment 

Standard equipment includes a 10.9-inch display with Porsche Communication Management (PCM) and navigation system, a 8-speed PDK transmission and driver assistance systems including collision detection with braking intervention. A Wet Mode feature is also introduced on the 992 which uses acoustic sensors on the wheel wells to detect wet pavement and adjusts the stability control, the rear wing position, and gearbox responsiveness to keep the car stable. 
A Sport Chrono package is also available on all models and features an overboost function that provides increased performance for 20 seconds. 0– acceleration times are decreased by 0.2 second with the Sport Chrono package.

Models

Carrera, Carrera 4, Carrera S and Carrera 4S 
The first models to debut in November 2018 in the 992 lineage were the Carrera S and Carrera 4S, displayed at the 2018 LA Auto Show. Both of the models are powered by a 3.0-litre twin-turbocharged flat-6 engine. The Carrera S and Carrera 4S Cabriolet followed in January 2019 while the base Carrera and Carrera 4 was introduced in July 2019.

Targa 4 and Targa 4S 
The Targa body style for the 992-generation 911 premiered on the Porsche web-TV channel 9:11 Magazine on 18 May 2020. The models share the all-wheel drive drivetrain of the Carrera 4 with 8-speed PDK transmission and Carrera 4S with PDK or optional seven-speed manual, respectively.

The Targa 4 is fitted with  discs on both axles while the Targa 4S has larger  discs on both axles. The Porsche Active Suspension Management (PASM) is part of the standard equipment for the new 911 Targa models. The Porsche Torque Vectoring Plus (PTV Plus), which includes an electronic rear differential lock with fully variable torque distribution, is standard for the Targa 4S and is optional on the Targa 4.

In June 2020, Porsche revealed the Targa 4S Heritage Design Edition. The car uses design elements from early Carrera models with for example teardrops on each front fender and the motorsports graphics on the flanks. The car can be ordered with either the seven-speed manual transmission or PDK dual-clutch automatic and the worldwide production is limited to only 992 units.

Carrera GTS, Carrera 4 GTS, Targa 4 GTS

Turbo and Turbo S 
The engine is based on the 3.0 litre unit found in the Carrera models and has a slightly shorter stroke than that of the outgoing Turbo S engine. The compression ratio has also decreased to 8.7:1. Both the turbochargers and the air intake system are larger, with the latter now being located directly behind the engine instead of in the rear fenders as on previous 911 Turbo models. The rear fenders now house the air filters instead. Two new factory options are available: Active Suspension Management and a sport exhaust. Standard equipment includes Porsche dynamic chassis control (PDCC), rear-axle steering and ceramic composite brakes. The front now has adaptive cooling flaps, while the rear wing is larger and generates 15 percent more downforce than the previous model. Active anti-rollbars, adaptive dampers and rear wheel steering are standard features. In July 2020, the Turbo variant was introduced.

In a test conducted by Sport Auto on 30th January 2021, the 992 Turbo S with optional Aerokit lapped the Nürburgring Nordschleife, on its first attempt, the car ran a 7:25 minute lap, on the second attempt car itself ran a 7:21 minute lap around the track. However magazine described, Porsche claimed that the car performs even better on damp conditions than dry conditions because of its unique wet driving mode and specifically developed Pirelli P Zero NA1 tires that has more grip on damp conditions. Sport Auto attempted the 3rd lap on damp conditions, and the car lapped the 20.6 km course of the track in 7:17.3 minutes, which is 0.2 seconds slower than the Sport Auto tested previous generation 991.2 Turbo S's lap time. According to the magazine Porsche claimed 992 Turbo S had the same performance as its predecessor during pre-production testing at the Nordschleife, However the lap time made the 992 Turbo S, third fastest road-legal production vehicle to lap the racetrack at the time without using semi-slick tires. 9 seconds slower than the record holder Nissan GT-R Nismo, and 3 seconds slower than the Lexus LFA Nürburgring Package.

GT3 and GT3 Touring 

In February 2021, Porsche introduced the 992's GT3 version. Like most other GT3 Porsches, It is intended for mixed usage with a more track-focused setup. The 992 GT3 recently set a lap time at Nürburgring Nordschleife with a time of 6:55.34 minutes.

Unlike the standard model, the GT3 features a large rear spoiler with larger air vents, a bigger diffuser, two large exhaust connections, bucket seats in its interior, and an optional roll cage.

The GT3 uses a 7-speed PDK or a 6-speed manual instead of the 7-speed manual or 8-speed PDK used in other models.

GT3 RS 
In August 2022, Porsche unveiled the 992 GT3 RS. A further evolution of other GT3 Porsches, it represents the highest track performance of their road-going 911's. It features a dramatically improved aerodynamic profile compared to the 992 GT3, resulting in 860 kg of downforce at 285kmh, a two-fold increase over the 991.2 GT3 RS, and 409 kg of downforce at 200kmh. The rear wing features a static portion and an active portion, which can open and close automatically based on vehicle data, or manually with a button fitted to the steering wheel, inspired by Formula 1's Drag Reduction Systems (DRS).

Its engine produces 525 PS at 8500 rpm and 465 Nm of torque at 6300 rpm. The car has a redline of 9000 rpm (same as the GT3 done by its naturally aspirated flat-six engine). The curb weight of the car in European specification is 1450 kg, and it's capable of achieving 100 km/h in 3.2 seconds, and 200 km/h in 10.6 seconds. The top speed stated by Porsche is 296 km/h.

Sport Classic 

In April 2022, Porsche revealed the 911 Sport Classic. The car is based on a Turbo S but can only be had with RWD (instead of AWD) and only offers a 7-speed manual transmission (which is not an option on Turbo models). The combination of RWD and manual-transmission was first found in the original Porsche 930 of the 70's. Porsche had to de-tune the engine as the manual transmission couldn't handle the power and torque of the engine found in the Turbo. At the time of its reveal, the Sport Classic is the most powerful 992 with a manual transmission, followed by the manual GT3. Porsche had to slightly decrease the front spring rates because the car doesn't have all-wheel drive. Visually, the car shares the same wide body found on Turbo models but doesn't have intakes in the rear fenders. Instead, the Sport Classic has ducts integrated into its ducktail spoiler. The hood is made of carbon fiber and all the active aero found on the Turbo have been removed. The worldwide production will be limited to 1,250 units. The last time Porsche had sold a Sport Classic car was with the 997 generation, which was based on a Carrera GTS and for which the worldwide production was limited to only 250 units.

911 Dakar 

In November 2022, Porsche launched the Porsche 911 Dakar at the Los Angeles Auto Show. The model makes use of the same 2,981 cc engine found in the 911 GTS and is available only in AWD with the 8-speed PDK and is limited to only 2,500 units.

Specifications

Engines

Performance 

SC = With Sport Chrono Package (included as standard with manual transmission).

Marketing
Porsche Design sold 911 Speaker inspired by the vehicle. The series also includes 911 Soundbar with Black Editiion - Limited Edition variant, where the Limited Edition was inspired by 911 GT3 and made in 911 units. A 911 Soundbar Special Edition version was sold via Porsche Smart Mobility Canada Ltd. with limit of 500 units.

References

External links 

 

2020s cars
All-wheel-drive vehicles
Cars introduced in 2018
Cars powered by boxer engines
Convertibles
Coupés
992
Rear-engined vehicles
Rear-wheel-drive vehicles
Sports cars